The 1976 AFC Asian Cup Final was a football match which determined the winner of the 1976 AFC Asian Cup, the 6th edition of the AFC Asian Cup, a quadrennial tournament contested by the men's national teams of the member associations of the Asian Football Confederation. The match was won by Iran, defeating Kuwait 1–0 to win their third AFC Asian Cup.

Venue

The Aryamehr Stadium (now Azadi Stadium), located in Tehran, Iran, hosted the 1976 AFC Asian Cup Final. The 78,116-seat stadium was built in 1971 and is primarily used by the Iran national football team. It was the main stadium used to host the 1976 Asian Cup; seven matches were played in the stadium including the final.

Route to the final

Match

References

External links 
 

Final
Iran national football team matches
Kuwait national football team matches
1976 in Iran
1972
June 1976 sports events in Asia
Sports competitions in Iran